Minimum Efficiency Reporting Value, commonly known as MERV, is a measurement scale designed in 1987 by the American Society of Heating, Refrigerating and Air-Conditioning Engineers (ASHRAE) to report the effectiveness of air filters in more detail than other ratings. For example, often a HEPA filter is impractical in residential central HVAC systems due to the large pressure drop the dense filter material causes. Experiments indicate that less obstructive, medium-efficiency filters of MERV 7 to 13 are almost as effective as true HEPA filters at removing allergens within residential air handling units.

The scale is designed to represent the worst-case performance of a filter when dealing with particles in the range of 0.3 to 10 micrometers. The MERV value is from 1 to 16. Higher MERV values correspond to a greater percentage of particles captured on each pass, with a MERV 16 filter capturing more than 95% of particles over the full range.

The table displayed below is a grouping of MERV values by particle size:

While the lowest MERV value in each row has no minimum requirement for filtering the particle size for that row, it does have stricter requirements for all larger particle sizes than any lower MERV value. For example, MERV 13 has no minimum requirement for removing 0.3–1.0 μm particles (the standard specifies <75%) but has higher minimum requirements for removing 1.0–3.0 μm, 3.0–10.0 μm, and > 10 μm particles than MERV 12 and all lower MERV values. All other MERV values on each row do have minimum removal percentages for that row's particle size.

Similar scales
Two proprietary scales are used to rate sub-HEPA air filters.

The Home Depot scale is known as filter performance rating (FPR), and is reduced from a 1-10 scale to only 4, 7, 9, and 10. It measures ability to capture large particles, small particles, and weight change over the lifetime of the filter.

The 3M scale is known as microparticle performance rating (MPR) and measures the ability to filter particles 0.3 to 1 microns.

Although the standards measure slightly different attributes and thus, are not strictly convertible, one retailer reported the following typical equivalents.

See also
 High-efficiency particulate arrestance (HEPA) 
 ULPA – removes 99.999% of dust, pollen, mold, bacteria, and particles larger than 120 nm
 Microparticle performance rating
 Corsi–Rosenthal Box

References

External links
http://www.epa.gov/iaq/pubs/residair.html

Air filters
Heating, ventilation, and air conditioning